Mátyás Korányi (also known as Mátyás Kronenberger; born 1910) was a Hungarian international footballer who played professionally in France for Olympique Lillois. His two brothers Désiré and Lajos were also footballers.

References

1910 births
Year of death missing
Hungarian footballers
Hungary international footballers
Place of birth missing

Association footballers not categorized by position
Olympique Lillois players